The Sincorá antwren (Formicivora grantsaui) is a small passerine bird of the genus Formicivora in the family Thamnophilidae, the typical antbirds. It is endemic to a small area of eastern Brazil. The bird was not described as a new species until 2007 (coincidentally, another species was also described from the same region in 2007, the Diamantina tapaculo). The binomial name commemorates the German-born naturalist Rolf Grantsau who collected a specimen in 1965 that was recently identified as this species.

Taxonomy
The Sincorá antwren was first described in 2007 from a specimen collected near the small town of Mucugê in the state of Bahia, eastern Brazil. It was given the binomial name Formicivora grantsaui. The specific epithet commemorates the German-born naturalist Rolf Grantsau who had collected a specimen in 1965.

Description
The Sincorá antwren weighs . The adult male has brown upperparts. The face, throat, breast and upper belly are black bordered with white. The lower belly and vent are grey and the flanks are brown. The upperwing-coverts are black with white spots while the underwing-coverts are grey and white. The tail feathers are grey below with white tips and a black subterminal band. The bill is black and the feet are grey with yellowish soles. Adult females are paler above than the males and have a white face and underparts with heavy black streaking. The rusty-backed antwren (F. rufa) is similar to the Sincorá antwren but has paler and more rufous upperparts, yellowish flanks and entirely white underwing-coverts.

The bird has several calls. The alarm call typically consists of three notes, a single note followed by two short notes. Other related antwrens usually have a two-note alarm call. The song is a series of repeated short notes uttered at a rate of about 2.1 notes per second, much slower than the song of the rusty-backed antwren. Pairs have a distinctive short duetting call, often given after singing. Birds also give a soft whistling distress call and a harsh scolding call.

Distribution and habitat
It is found in the Serra do Sincorá, part of the Espinhaço Mountains located at the eastern edge of the Chapada Diamantina region in the Bahia state. So far it has been recorded from four areas between 850 and 1100 metres above sea-level. It inhabits rocky outcrops in the scrubby savanna known as campo rupestre.

References

External links

Arthur Grosset's Birds: Sincorá antwren Formicivora grantsaui

Sincorá antwren
Birds of the Cerrado
Endemic birds of Brazil
Sincorá antwren